Stefan Janos (born Janosch Stefan) is a German Sambo, mixed martial artist and Judo practitioner who won the Silver Medal at the 2008 World Sambo Championships, in Men's Combat Sambo. Janosch defeated Pedro Brett (Venezuela), Volodimir Begeza (Ukraine), and Arsen Khachatryan (Armenia) without giving up a point before falling to eventual champion Blagoi Ivanov (Bulgaria) in the final. Janosch has also competed in many grappling competitions, and recently began a career in mixed martial arts.

Mixed martial arts record

|-
| Win
|align=center| 5–4
|Bjoern Schmiedeberg
|Decision (majority)
|GMC 5 – German MMA Championship 
|
|align=center| 3
|align=center| 5:00
|Castrop-Rauxel, Germany 
|
|-
| Loss
|align=center| 4–4
|Dritan Barjamaj
|TKO (corner stoppage)
|RA 1 – Respect Austria 1 
|
|align=center| 3
|align=center| 3:00
|Freistadt, Austria
|
|-
| Loss
|align=center| 4–3
|Dritan Barjamaj
|KO (knee and punch)
|Respect Fighting Championship 8
|
|align=center| 2
|align=center| 1:10
|Wuppertal, Germany
|
|-
|  Win
|align=center| 4-2
|Murat Gezerci
|Submission (keylock)
|Respect Fighting Championship 7
|
|align=center| 1
|align=center| 2:55
|Essen, Germany
|
|-
|  Loss
|align=center| 3-2
|Sultan Kasanow
|Submission (punches) 
|Riad Rumble
|
|align=center| 2
|align=center| 2:20
|Castrop-Rauxel, North Rhine-Westphalia, Germany
|
|-
|  Win
|align=center| 3-1
|Igor Swonkin
|Submission (strikes) 
|SFC 4 – Germany vs. Russia
|
|align=center| 1
|align=center| 0:42
|Giessen, Germany
|
|-
|  Loss
|align=center| 2-1
|Karol Celinski
|Submission (rear-naked choke) 
|IFF – The Eternal Struggle
|
|align=center| 3
|align=center| 2:16
|Dąbrowa Górnicza, Silesian Voivodeship, Poland
|
|-
|  Win
|align=center| 2-0
|Thorsten Klein
|TKO (knee) 
|RFC – Respect Fighting Championship 4
|
|align=center| 1
|align=center| 0:49
|Herne, North Rhine-Westphalia, Germany
|
|-
|  Win
|align=center| 1-0
|Nacim Bouaita
|KO (punch)
|Backstreet Fights 3 – Herb vs. Babene
|
|align=center| 1
|align=center| 3:35
|Heilbronn, Germany
|MMA debut
|-

References

External links
  on sambo.com

Living people
1981 births
German male mixed martial artists
Heavyweight mixed martial artists
German male judoka
German sambo practitioners
Sportspeople from Karlsruhe
German people of Hungarian descent
Mixed martial artists utilizing sambo
Mixed martial artists utilizing judo
21st-century German people